The Kellogg-Keebler Classic was a golf tournament on the LPGA Tour from 2002 to 2004. It was played at the Stonebridge Country Club in Aurora, Illinois.

Winners
2004 Karrie Webb
2003 Annika Sörenstam
2002 Annika Sörenstam

References

External links
Coverage on LPGA Tour's official site

Former LPGA Tour events
Golf in Chicago
Aurora, Illinois
2002 establishments in Illinois
2004 disestablishments in Illinois
History of women in Illinois